Emicocarpus is a species of plants in the family Apocynaceae first described as a genus in 1900. It contains only one known species, Emicocarpus fissifolius, native to tropical Africa.

References

Asclepiadoideae
Monotypic Apocynaceae genera
Flora of Mozambique